The Communist Party of Iran is an Iranian communist party founded on 2 September 1983.

Communist Party of Iran may also refer to:
 Communist Party of Persia (1917–1921)
 Communist Party of Iran (Marxist–Leninist–Maoist), founded in 2001
 Tudeh Party of Iran, founded in 1941
 Worker-communist Party of Iran, founded in 1991